Carsten Ball and Chris Guccione were the defending champions but Ball decided not to participate.
Guccione played alongside Samuel Groth.
Tennys Sandgren and Rhyne Williams won the title against Devin Britton and Austin Krajicek by defeating them 4–6, 6–4, [12–10] in the final.

Seeds

Draw

Draw

References
 Main Draw

Natomas Men's Professional Tennis Tournament - Doubles
2012 Doubles